Final Vinyl may refer to:

Final Vinyl (Hot Tuna album), 1979
Final Vinyl (The Teardrops album), 1980

See also
Finyl Vinyl, a 1986 Rainbow album